The 1992 Western Athletic Conference men's basketball tournament was held March 11–13 at Moby Arena at Colorado State University in Fort Collins, Colorado.

Top-seeded BYU repeated as tournament champions by defeating UTEP in the championship game, 73–71, to clinch their second overall WAC men's tournament championship. Both teams shared the WAC regular season conference title. 

The Cougars, in turn, received an automatic bid to the 1992 NCAA tournament. They were joined in the tournament by UTEP, who earned an at-large bid.

Format
Even though WAC membership remained fixed at nine, the tournament field dropped to eight, forcing the elimination of the play-in round game between the eighth- and ninth-seed teams. As such, only the top eight teams, again seeded based on regular season conference records, participated in the tournament, all entering the tournament into the quarterfinal round.

Bracket

References

WAC men's basketball tournament
Tournament
WAC men's basketball tournament
WAC men's basketball tournament